The Hurly Baronetcy, of Knocklong in County Limerick, was a title in the Baronetage of Ireland. It was created circa 1645 for Thomas Hurly. The 3rd Baronet was attainted in 1691 for his part in the Williamite War in Ireland, and the baronetcy was forfeited.

Hurly baronets, of Knocklong (c. 1645)
Sir Thomas Hurly, 1st Baronet (died )
Sir Maurice Hurly, 2nd Baronet (died c. 1684)
Sir William Hurly, 3rd Baronet (died 1691)

References

Stirnet: Butler05 (requires subscription to view without interruption; a daughter of the 1st Baronet married into this Butler family)
Stirnet: Purdon1 (requires subscription to view without interruption; a granddaughter of the 2nd Baronet married into this Purdon family)

External links
 (contains Hurly Baronetcy)
thePeerage.com: Sir Thomas Hurly, (1st) Bt.

Forfeited baronetcies in the Baronetage of Ireland
1645 establishments in England